Shute–Meierjurgen Farmstead is a farm located in the north of Hillsboro Airport, in the vicinity of Hillsboro, Washington County, Oregon. It is listed on the National Register of Historic Places in 2018.

History 
The farmstead built-in 1890 on a donational land claimed by Edward and Brazilla Constable, who arrived from Missouri and settled there in 1843.

Gallery

References

External links

National Register of Historic Places in Washington County, Oregon
Houses in Hillsboro, Oregon
Houses on the National Register of Historic Places in Oregon
1890 establishments in Oregon
Houses completed in 1890
Barns on the National Register of Historic Places in Oregon